The Communauté d'agglomération Maubeuge Val de Sambre is an intercommunal structure, centred on the city of Maubeuge. It is located in the Nord department, in the Hauts-de-France region, northern France. It was created in December 2013. Its seat is in Maubeuge. Its area is 343.6 km2. Its population was 125,651 in 2017, of which 29,944 in Maubeuge proper.

Composition
The communauté d'agglomération consists of the following 43 communes:

Aibes
Assevent
Aulnoye-Aymeries
Bachant
Beaufort
Berlaimont
Bersillies
Bettignies
Bousignies-sur-Roc
Boussières-sur-Sambre
Boussois
Cerfontaine
Colleret
Cousolre
Éclaibes
Écuélin
Élesmes
Feignies
Ferrière-la-Grande
Ferrière-la-Petite
Gognies-Chaussée
Hautmont
Jeumont
Leval
Limont-Fontaine
Louvroil
Mairieux
Marpent
Maubeuge
Monceau-Saint-Waast
Neuf-Mesnil
Noyelles-sur-Sambre
Obrechies
Pont-sur-Sambre
Quiévelon
Recquignies
Rousies
Saint-Remy-Chaussée
Saint-Remy-du-Nord
Sassegnies
Vieux-Mesnil
Vieux-Reng
Villers-Sire-Nicole

References

Maubeuge Val de Sambre
Maubeuge Val de Sambre